Molly and I is a 1920 American silent drama film directed by Howard M. Mitchell and starring Shirley Mason, Alan Roscoe and Harry Dunkinson.

Cast
 Shirley Mason as Molly / Shirley Brown
 Alan Roscoe as Philip Smith
 Harry Dunkinson as Jack Herrick
 Lila Leslie as Marion Sutherland

References

Bibliography
 Solomon, Aubrey. The Fox Film Corporation, 1915-1935: A History and Filmography. McFarland, 2011.

External links
 

1920 films
1920 drama films
1920s English-language films
American silent feature films
Silent American drama films
American black-and-white films
Films directed by Howard M. Mitchell
Fox Film films
1920s American films